Ark Avilon Zoo was an indoor zoo in Pasig, Metro Manila, Philippines. It was affiliated with the Avilon Zoo in Rodriguez (Montalban), Rizal.

History
The Ark Avilon Zoo was a joint venture between the company behind the Rizal-based Avilon Zoo and Ortigas & Co. Ltd. Partnership. The indoor zoo housed inside an ark-like structure was opened in 2008. It closed in 2019, after operating for 11 years, after Avilon Zoo's lease agreement with Ortigas & Co. expired.

Zoo building
The Ark Avilon Zoo was housed inside a two-storey structure which is patterned after Noah's Ark. The zoo was part of the Tiendesitas development of Ortigas & Co. at Ortigas East (formerly Frontera Verde)

Animals

In 2018, there were reportedly 100 kinds of animals housed inside the Ark Avilon. Among the animals exhibited include the capybara, meerkats, tigers (white tiger and Bengal tiger) and the sunbear. It also had reptiles such as Philippine saltwater crocodile and fishes such as the arapaima

References

Indoor zoos
Buildings and structures in Pasig
Tourist attractions in Metro Manila
Zoos in the Philippines
Former zoos
Zoos established in 2008
Zoos disestablished in 2019